Scott Hale (born 14 December 1991) is an English former professional rugby league footballer who played in the 2010s for St. Helens, and the Dewsbury Rams.

Career
Hale started his career at St. Helens, signing for the club from Haydock Warriors, after attending and playing for Haydock Sports College in secondary school rugby. He moved to Dewsbury in 2013. In May 2017, after making over 100 appearances for the Dewsbury club, he announced his retirement due to a recurring shoulder injury.

References

External links
Saints Heritage Society profile

1991 births
Living people
Dewsbury Rams players
English rugby league players
Rugby league centres
Rugby league players from Lancashire
Rugby league second-rows
St Helens R.F.C. players
Swinton Lions players